Gumdel  is a village development committee in Ramechhap District in the Bagmati Province of north-eastern Nepal. At the time of the 1991 Nepal census it had a population of 2,644 people living in 486 individual households.

References

External links
UN map of the municipalities of Ramechhap District

Populated places in Ramechhap District